The second season of the international fantasy series Highlander: The Series, part of the Highlander franchise, consists of 22 episodes produced between 1993 and 1994. The first episode of the season aired on September 27, 1993 in broadcast syndication and the last aired on May 23, 1994. The series continues to follow the adventures of Duncan MacLeod, a 400-year-old Immortal who can only die if he is beheaded. MacLeod is involved in the Game, an ongoing battle during which all Immortals have to behead each other until only one is left.

A number of changes affected the cast as well as the co-production agreement that financed the previous season. Ratings increased, but Highlander received criticism for being too violent. The season was released on DVD in Region 1 on July 29, 2003 by Anchor Bay Entertainment. The episodes are available on the online video on demand service Hulu, a joint venture between NBC and Fox Broadcasting Company.

Production
The first season aired earlier in the United States than elsewhere, thus in early 1993, Rysher TPE, the distributor that had sold the series to the American market, had to make a decision about financing a new season. At this point, the European partners still had not aired the first season, so the decision fell to Rysher. Willing to take the risk, Rysher announced that it would produce a second season. The France/Canada co-production agreement of the previous season was reconstituted, albeit with some different partners. Gaumont Television (France), Rysher TPE (United States) and Reteitalia (Italy) agreed to renew their participation to a new season. French leading channel TF1 was forced to cancel its participation because it was no longer legally allowed to qualify a show filmed in English as French content, and was replaced by French smaller channel M6, which was still allowed to do so. RTL Plus (Germany) and Amuse Video (Japan) were also no longer part of the co-production, but Gaumont Television president Christian Charret signed Filmline International (Canada) as a new partner. As a result of this new co-production agreement, with less wealthy partners, the budget of the season decreased from US$26.1 million the previous year to $22 million. Half of the funding came from French and other European sources; income per episode from international sales, which had reached $800,000 in the previous season, decreased as well. According to The Hollywood Reporter, pre-production started in April 1993, and filming in June the same year. Like the first season, the second season was divided into two segments; the first segment was filmed in Vancouver, British Columbia, Canada (as the fictional city of Seacouver, Washington, United States), and the second in Paris, France, to secure an acceptable share of European content as part of the co-production agreement. Creatively, the second season was intended to be more action-oriented than the first, but lead actor Adrian Paul refused to do "another kung fu series", insisting that more romance and history be brought in the scripts.

The production staff underwent a number of changes following the reshaping of the co-production partnership. Bill Panzer, Peter S. Davis, Christian Charret and Gaumont co-production executive Marla Ginsburg were executive producers. Filmline president Nicolas Clermont became the only co-executive producer. Ken Gord replaced Barry Rosen and Gary Goodman as the new producer. Former executives in charge of production, Marc du Pontavice and Denis Leroy, returned as associate producer and coordinating producer respectively. David Abramowitz served as head writer, but he could not be credited as such because Highlander was a Canadian-based show, and only Canadian writers could author scripts; Abramowitz was American, and thus was credited as creative consultant instead. The executive script editor was David Tynan, who also contributed scripts along staff and freelance writers, Brad Wright among the latter. Brent Karl Clackson was the line producer in Vancouver, but was succeeded by Patrick Millet (with the title of production manager) on the Paris segment. Regular directors throughout the season were Clay Borris and Dennis Berry. Fencing coach Bob Anderson, who coined for himself the title of Master of Swords, resumed his work from the third episode onwards, after David Boushey choreographed the fights of episode two. The opening theme was "Princes of the Universe" from the 1986 album A Kind of Magic by Queen; incidental music was composed by Roger Bellon.

Cast
The main cast also underwent substantial changes during the season. Adrian Paul (Duncan MacLeod) and Stan Kirsch (playing Richie Ryan, the quick-talking street punk) returned to play their characters, but Alexandra Vandernoot who had portrayed Tessa Noël, the French artist, decided to leave the show. Vandernoot only appeared in (and had star billing for) the first four episodes of the season, and her character was killed in the fourth episode "The Darkness". She did, however, return to make a guest appearance as the murderer Lisa Halle, in the two-part season finale "Counterfeit".

Jim Byrnes was introduced as MacLeod's Watcher, Joe Dawson, in the season's first episode "The Watchers". The Watchers are members of a secret society that observes Immortals without interfering in the Game. Another new actor Philip Akin had star billing in episodes three to fifteen playing Charlie DeSalvo, a martial arts teacher and ex-Navy SEAL. MacLeod buys and lives in DeSalvo's dojo after Tessa's death. Akin was replaced in the main cast when production moved to Paris for the second segment. Michel Modo took Akin's place, acting as Maurice Lalonde, an unemployed former chef living next to MacLeod's barge, and had star billing in episodes sixteen to twenty-two.

Actors returning to play recurring characters included: Elizabeth Gracen as Amanda, an international thief; Roland Gift as Xavier St. Cloud, a hedonistic killer; and Peter Hudson as James Horton, Dawson's brother-in-law and leader of the Hunters, a group of renegade Watchers who believe Immortals must be eliminated. New recurring characters introduced in the season were: Immortal baseball player Carl Robinson, portrayed by Bruce A. Young; CID Special Agent Renee Delaney, played by Stacey Travis; and Immortal mentor Rebecca Horne, played by Nadia Cameron.

Reception

During the 1993 November sweeps period, 4.1 percent of viewers aged 18 to 49 watched the episode, representing a 17 percent gain from the previous year's ratings, which scored 3.5.
The household average for all dayparts scored 2.7/9. This means that an average of 2.7 percent of viewers aged 18 to 49, as well as 9 percent of all viewers watching television at the time, watched each episode during the sweeps. This represented an increase of 40 to 50 percent of the series' share of key demographic rating groups.
Ratings reached 4.6 during the 1994 February sweeps.

Rick Sanchez of IGN wrote that the pilot episode "The Watchers" demonstrated "a huge leap in quality and style for the show that just keeps getting better and better by episode" and that "Season Two pretty much surpasses Season One in every way imaginable." Sanchez gave the season an overall rating of 8 out of 10. Two episodes were nominated for the 1994 Golden Reel Awards in the One Hour Series category: "The Darkness" for sound editing, and "The Zone" for ADR editing.

A February 1994 study by Samuel Robert Lichter, president of the Center for Media and Public Affairs, found that the second season of Highlander was the most violent syndicated show of the 1993-1994 season. According to it, there were 31 scenes of violence in the premiere episode.
Charret also admitted the series received adverse criticism for being too violent.
Abramowitz disagreed that Highlander was violent and stressed that staff writers "work very hard at having MacLeod not take pleasure in causing death."
Gord pointed out the non-graphic nature of violence in the show and likened Immortals to vampire mythology, saying, "The vampire sucks some blood and you stick him through the heart with a stake and nobody takes that seriously."
Steven Maier, executive financial consultant on the second season, noted that the beheadings in Highlander might make the show look "extremely violent", but insisted that violence could be depicted in "non-graphic ways" and was "highly stylized" in Highlander.

Episodes

Home media

Notes

References

External links
 Highlander: The Series episode list at Epguides
 Highlander: The Series episode list at the Internet Movie Database

2
1993 Canadian television seasons
1994 Canadian television seasons
1993 French television seasons
1994 French television seasons